The Lab is a not-for-profit arts organization and performance space located in San Francisco's Redstone Building. Since 1984, The Lab has hosted performances and projects by artists including Nan Goldin, Barbara Kruger, David Wojnarowicz, Barry McGee, Kim Gordon and Kathleen Hanna.  In 2018 the organization began paying fees of $25,000 to $75,000 to artists in residence.

History
It was founded in 1984 as Co-LAB by a group of five art students (Laura Brun, John DiStefano, Tami Logan, Alan Millar and Nomi Seidman) from San Francisco State University. It changed its name from Co-Lab to The Lab in 1985. 

Its original site was at 1805 and 1807 Divisadero Street; in 1995 it moved to the Redstone Building. In 2019, in collaboration with the Mission Economic Development Agency, it launched a campaign to purchase the Redstone building.

References

External links
 Official site

Arts organizations
Non-profit organizations based in California
Organizations based in San Francisco
Art museums and galleries in California